Arthur Hammond may refer to:

 Arthur George Hammond (1843–1919), British Army colonel, English recipient of the Victoria Cross
 Arthur L. Hammond, American missionary in Cambodia
 Arthur William Hammond (1890–1959), British World War I flying ace
 Arthur Verney Hammond (1892–1982), British Indian Army officer

See also
 Arthur Henry Knighton-Hammond (1875–1970)
 Arthur Hammond Marshall